Şimşelli, Nazilli is a village in the District of Nazilli, Aydın Province, Turkey. As of 2010 it had a population of 218 people.

References

Villages in Nazilli District